A total of 32 teams, 20 from West Asia and 12 from East Asia, competed in the 2011 AFC Cup group stage. They included 28 direct entries and 4 losers of the 2011 AFC Champions League qualifying play-off (two from West Asia and two from East Asia).

The draw for the group stage was held in Kuala Lumpur, Malaysia on 7 December 2010. The 32 teams were drawn into eight groups of four. Clubs from the same country may not be drawn into the same group.

In each group, teams played each other home-and-away in a round-robin format. The matchdays were 1–2 March, 15–16 March, 12–13 April, 26–27 April, 3–4 May, and 10–11 May 2011.

The winners and runners-up of each group advanced to the knockout stage.

Tiebreakers
The clubs are ranked according to points and tie breakers are in following order:
Greater number of points obtained in the group matches between the teams concerned;
Goal difference resulting from the group matches between the teams concerned;
Greater number of goals scored in the group matches between the teams concerned; (Away goals do not apply)
Goal difference in all the group matches;
Greater number of goals scored in all the group matches;
Kicks from the penalty mark if only two teams are involved and they are both on the field of play;
Fewer score calculated according to the number of yellow and red cards received in the group matches; (1 point for each yellow card, 3 points for each red card as a consequence of two yellow cards, 3 points for each direct red card, 4 points for each yellow card followed by a direct red card)
Drawing of lots.

Groups

Group A

Notes
Note 1: Al-Tilal v Al-Ansar moved to Jordan due to the political situation in Yemen.
Note 2: Al Tilal v Dempo moved to India due to the political situation in Yemen.

Group B

Notes
Note 3: Al-Saqr vs Al-Qadsia moved to Kuwait and brought forward from 26 April 2011 to 15 April 2011 due to the political situation in Yemen.
Note 4: Al-Saqr vs Shurtan Guzar moved to Syria due to the political situation in Yemen.

Group C

Notes
Note 5: Al-Faisaly v Duhok moved to Amman International Stadium at Amman.

Group D

Group E

Notes
Note 6: Last two home matches of Al-Karamah moved to Abbasiyyin Stadium at Damascus after approval by AFC.

Group F

Group G

Group H

Notes
Note 7: Last two home matches of Persipura Jayapura moved to Mandala Stadium at Jayapura after approval by AFC.
Note 8: Kingfisher East Bengal v South China moved to Barabati Stadium at Cuttack due to the state assembly elections which would mean lack of security personnel for the match in Kolkata.

References

External links
AFC Cup Official Page 

Group stage